Juan Antonio Fernández Marín (born 3 December 1957 in Madrid, Spain) is a former Spanish professional football referee.

References

External links
 
 

1967 births
Living people
Spanish football referees